Chinese shamanism, alternatively called Wuism (alternatively  wū xí zōngjiào), refers to the shamanic religious tradition of China. Its features are especially connected to the ancient Neolithic cultures such as the Hongshan culture. Chinese shamanic traditions are intrinsic to Chinese folk religion.

Various ritual traditions are rooted in original Chinese shamanism: contemporary Chinese ritual masters are sometimes identified as wu by outsiders, though most orders don't self-identify as such. Also Taoism has some of its origins from Chinese shamanism: it developed around the pursuit of long life (shou /), or the status of a xian ("mountain man", "holy man").

Meaning of wu

The Chinese word wu  "shaman, wizard", indicating a person who can mediate with the powers generating things (the etymological meaning of "spirit", "god", or nomen agentis, virtus, energeia), was first recorded during the Shang dynasty (ca. 1600-1046 BCE), when a wu could be either sex. During the late Zhou dynasty (1045-256 BCE) wu was used to specify "female shaman; sorceress" as opposed to xi  "male shaman; sorcerer" (which first appears in the 4th century BCE Guoyu). Other sex-differentiated shaman names include nanwu  for "male shaman; sorcerer; wizard"; and nüwu , wunü , wupo , and wuyu  for "female shaman; sorceress; witch".

The word tongji  (lit. "youth diviner") "shaman; spirit-medium" is a near-synonym of wu. Modern Chinese distinguishes native wu from "Siberian shaman": saman  or saman ; and from Indian Shramana "wandering monk; ascetic": shamen , sangmen , or sangmen .

Berthold Laufer (1917:370) proposed an etymological relation between Mongolian bügä "shaman", Turkic bögü "shaman", Chinese bu, wu (shaman), buk, puk (to divine), and Tibetan aba (pronounced ba, sorcerer). Coblin (1986:107) puts forward a Sino-Tibetan root * "magician; sorcerer" for Chinese wu < mju < *mjag  "magician; shaman" and Written Tibetan 'ba'-po "sorcerer" and 'ba'-mo "sorcereress" (of the Bön religion). Further connections are to the bu-mo priests of Zhuang Shigongism and the bi-mo priests of Bimoism, the Yi indigenous faith. Also Korean mu  (of Muism) is cognate to Chinese wu . Schuessler lists some etymologies: wu could be cognate with wu  "to dance"; wu could also be cognate with mu  "mother" since wu, as opposed to xi , were typically female; wu could be a loanword from Iranian *maghu or *maguš "magi; magician", meaning an "able one; specialist in ritual". Mair (1990) provides archaeological and linguistic evidence that Chinese wu < *myag  "shaman; witch, wizard; magician" was maybe a loanword from Old Persian *maguš "magician; magi". Mair connects the nearly identical Chinese Bronze script for wu and Western heraldic cross potent ☩, an ancient symbol of a magus or magician, which etymologically descend from the same Indo-European root.

Early history
The Chinese religion from the Shang dynasty onwards developed around ancestral worship. The main gods from this period are not forces of nature in the Sumerian way, but deified virtuous men. The ancestors of the emperors were called di, and the greatest of them was called Shangdi ("the Highest Lord"). He is identified with the dragon (Kui ), symbol of the universal power (qi).

Cosmic powers dominate nature: the Sun, the Moon, stars, winds and clouds were considered informed by divine energies. The earth god is She or Tu. The Shang period had two methods to enter in contact with divine ancestors: the first is the numinous-mystical wu practice, involving dances and trances; and the second is the method of the oracle bones, a rational way.

The Zhou dynasty, succeeding the Shang, was more rooted in an agricultural worldview. They opposed the ancestor-gods of the Shang, and gods of nature became dominant. The utmost power in this period was named Tian ("heaven"). With Di ("earth") he forms the whole cosmos in a complementary duality.

Qing period 

The Manchu rulers of the Qing dynasty (1636–1912) introduced substantial elements of Tungusic shamanism to China. Hong Taiji (1592–1643) put shamanistic practices in the service of the state, notably by forbidding others to erect new shrines (tangse) for ritual purposes. In the 1620s and 1630s, the Qing ruler conducted shamanic sacrifices at the tangse of Mukden, the Qing capital. In 1644, as soon as the Qing seized Beijing to begin their conquest of China, they named it their new capital and erected an official shamanic shrine there. In the Beijing tangse and in the women's quarters of the Forbidden City, Qing emperors and professional shamans (usually women) conducted shamanic ceremonies until the abdication of the dynasty in 1912.

In 1747 the Qianlong Emperor (r. 1735–1796) commissioned the publication of a Shamanic Code to revive and regulate shamanic practices, which he feared were becoming lost. He had it distributed to Bannermen to guide their practice, but we know very little about the effect of this policy. Mongols and Han Chinese were forbidden to attend shamanic ceremonies. Partly because of their secret aspect, these rituals attracted the curiosity of Beijing dwellers and visitors to the Qing capital. French Jesuit Joseph-Marie Amiot published a study on the Shamanic Code, "" (1773). In 1777 the Qianlong Emperor ordered the code translated into Chinese for inclusion in the Siku quanshu. The Manchu version was printed in 1778, whereas the Chinese-language edition, titled Qinding Manzhou jishen jitian dianli, was completed in 1780 or 1782. Even though this "Shamanic Code" did not fully unify shamanic practice among the Bannermen, it "helped systematize and reshape what had been a very fluid and diverse belief system."

Northeast shamanism  
 
Shamanism is practiced in Northeast China and is considered different from those of central and southern Chinese folk religion, as it resulted from the interaction of Han religion with folk religion practices of other Tungusic people such as Manchu shamanism. The shaman would perform various ritual functions for groups of believers and local communities, such as moon drum dance and chūmǎxiān (出馬仙 "riding for the immortals").

Modern Shamanism 
Shamanism saw a decline due to Neo-Confucianism labeling it as untutored and disorderly. This was furthered in the 19th century with the arrival of Western imperialism’s view of shamanism as superstition, opposing their view of science and western religion. The final hit was Maoist China causing all religious practices to disappear from public spaces. While spirit mediums have begun reappearing (mostly in rural China) since the 1980’s, they operate with a low profile, often working from their homes, relying on word of mouth to generate business, or in newly built temples under a Taoist Association membership card to be legitimate under the law. The term shamanism and the religion itself has been critiqued by Western scholars due to an unfair and limited comparison to more favored religions such as Christianity and other modern and more documented religions in Western society.

Today, the term shamanism has a somewhat negative stigma.  Spirit mediums are often viewed as scammers, and are frequently portrayed as such in television shows and comedies. Along with the focus on science, modern medicine, and material culture in China (which created serious doubt in spiritual practices), shamanism is viewed as an opposition to the modern focus of science and medicine in the pursuit of modernizing. The marginalization of shamanism is one of the reasons for it mostly being practiced in rural or less developed areas or in small towns, along with the lack of enforcement of anti-shamanism policies among authorities in rural areas (either because they believe in Shamanism themselves or “look the other way in concession to local beliefs”). Shamanistic practices today include controlling the weather, healing diseases modern medicine can not treat, exorcism of ghosts and demons, and seeing or divining the future.

Shamanism's decrease in popularity is not reflected in all areas. It still maintains popularity in many areas in southern China (such as in Chaoshan) and rural northern China.  Taiwan (although Taiwan tried to ban Shamanism, in the end only restricting it) still have many who openly practice without the stigma seen in other parts of China.

See also
 Chinese folk religion
 Chinese ritual mastery traditions
 Nuo folk religion
 Taoism

References

Bibliography
 
 
 
 
 
 
 
 
 
 
 
 
 

Further

External links
 Max Dashu. Xi Wangmu, the shamanic great goddess of China.

Chinese folk religion
Shamanism in China